The Judith Wright Award was an annual Australian poetry prize awarded as part of the ACT Poetry Award between 2005 and 2011. Judith Wright Award may also refer to:

Judith Wright Calanthe Award, an Australian poetry award, part of the Queensland Premier's Literary Awards since 2004
Judith Wright Poetry Prize for New and Emerging Poets, an Australian poetry award presented by Overland magazine since 2007